The Incolacridinae are a small subfamily of grasshoppers found mostly in Indochina and Malesia.

Circumscription
The type genus is Incolacris, originally based on the tribe "Incolacri", then elevated to subfamily level by S.Y. Storozhenko in 2021. In this review, Incolacris was revived to its original name  (having also been placed in the subfamily Catantopinae) and the genus Asymmetritania was separated from Stolzia (which is now restricted to Malesia, with uncertain records from India).

Genera
The Orthoptera Species File lists:
 Asymmetritania Storozhenko, 2021
 Bettotania Willemse, 1933
 Incolacris Willemse, 1932
 Stolzia Willemse, 1930

References

External links

Orthoptera subfamilies
Orthoptera of Asia
Acrididae